GY Andromedae (GY And) is an α2 Canum Venaticorum type variable star in the northern constellation Andromeda. Its brightness fluctuates in visual magnitude between 6.27m and 6.41m, making it a challenge to view with the naked eye even in good seeing conditions. The magnetic activity on this star shows an unusually long period of variability, cycling about once every 23 years.

This is classified as an Ap/Bp star, with a peculiar spectrum showing lines of chromium and europium that change in intensity over a period matching the variability cycle, although opposite in phase. Its most striking characteristic is the presence of the unstable element promethium in its emission spectrum. All isotopes of this element are radioactive with half lives of 17.7 years or less. The promethium in the outer envelope may be generated by the spontaneous fission of higher mass transuranic elements.

System
Based on radial velocity measurements taken at the Dominion Astrophysical Observatory between 1927 and 1935 Canadian astronomer William Edmund Harper strongly suspected that this star was a spectroscopic binary. In 1958, American astronomer Horace W. Babcock confirmed the binary nature of the star. It has an orbital period of 273 days with a large eccentricity of 0.47. The two components are separated by an estimated distance of at least , or 0.25 Astronomical Units.

References

External links
 Astronomie: Die Sterne - Special Stars: GY Andromedae

Andromeda (constellation)
Alpha2 Canum Venaticorum variables
B-type main-sequence stars
Spectroscopic binaries
0465
007651
009996
Andromedae, GY
Durchmusterung objects